Players and pairs who neither have high enough rankings nor receive wild cards may participate in a qualifying tournament held one week before the annual Wimbledon Tennis Championships.

Seeds

  Alexia Dechaume-Balleret (qualified)
  Ai Sugiyama (qualifying competition, lucky loser)
  Karin Kschwendt (second round)
  Tessa Price (qualifying competition, lucky loser)
  Andrea Strnadová (qualifying competition, lucky loser)
  Misumi Miyauchi (second round)
  Sandra Wasserman (first round)
  Nanne Dahlman (first round)
  Park Sung-hee (first round)
  Petra Kamstra (first round)
  Rennae Stubbs (second round)
  Nancy Feber (qualified)
  Elizabeth Smylie (qualified)
  Michelle Jaggard-Lai (second round)
  Rika Hiraki (first round)
  Rita Grande (first round)

Qualifiers

  Alexia Dechaume-Balleret
  Louise Field
  Nancy Feber
  Isabelle Demongeot
  Nana Miyagi
  Elizabeth Smylie
  Mercedes Paz
  Katrina Adams

Lucky losers

  Claire Wegink
  Tessa Price
  Andrea Strnadová
  Ai Sugiyama

Qualifying draw

First qualifier

Second qualifier

Third qualifier

Fourth qualifier

Fifth qualifier

Sixth qualifier

Seventh qualifier

Eighth qualifier

External links

1994 Wimbledon Championships on WTAtennis.com
1994 Wimbledon Championships – Women's draws and results at the International Tennis Federation

Women's Singles Qualifying
Wimbledon Championships